The 2022 NAIA Cross Country Championships will be the 67th annual NAIA Men's Cross Country Championship and 43rd annual NAIA Women's Cross Country Championship to determine the team and individual national champions of NAIA men's and women's collegiate cross country running in the United States.

These championships will be hosted by Apalachee Regional Park in Tallahassee, Florida.

Television 
The NAIA Network will stream the race.

Men's Team Result (Top 10)

Men's Individual Result (Top 10)

Women's Team Result (Top 10)

Women's Individual Result (Top 10)

See also 
 NCAA Men's Division I Cross Country Championship
 NCAA Women's Division I Cross Country Championship
 NCAA Men's Division II Cross Country Championship
 NCAA Women's Division II Cross Country Championship
 NCAA Men's Division III Cross Country Championship
 NCAA Women's Division III Cross Country Championship

Results 
 https://live.pttiming.com/XC-PTT.html?mid=5226

References 

Tallahassee, Florida
Track and field in Florida
NAIA Cross Country Championships
NAIA Cross Country Championships